The Journal of Higher Education Outreach and Engagement is a peer-reviewed open-access academic journal published by the University of Georgia. It was established in 1996 as the Journal of Public Service and Outreach. The journal covers issues concerning service learning and university outreach to surrounding communities. The journal publishes research articles, essays, descriptions of nascent university-community partnership projects, book reviews, and dissertation overviews.

External links
 

Open access journals
University of Georgia
English-language journals
Education journals
Quarterly journals